Long Lance: A Computer Game of Tactical Naval Combat in the South Pacific is a 1987 video game published by Simulations Canada.

Gameplay
Long Lance is a game in which naval combat is simulated during World War II.

Reception
Johnny L. Wilson reviewed the game for Computer Gaming World, and stated that "Long Lance delivers exciting and challenging games without the graphics or sophisticated sound."

References

1987 video games
Apple II games
Atari ST games
Commodore 64 games
Computer wargames
Japan in non-Japanese culture
Pacific War video games
Simulations Canada video games
Turn-based strategy video games
Video games developed in Canada
Video games set in Oceania